The Volksblatt und Freiheits-Freund was the leading German-language newspaper in Pittsburgh, Pennsylvania, during its publication from 1901 to 1942. It was formed from the merger of two predecessors, the Freiheits-Freund and Pittsburger Volksblatt.

Predecessors

Freiheits-Freund
The Freiheits-Freund ("Freedom's Friend") was founded as a weekly newspaper in 1834 by Henry Ruby, with Victor Scriba as editor, in Chambersburg, Pennsylvania. Scriba relocated it from there to Pittsburgh in 1837 after buying out Ruby. Content of the paper included news from Europe and the United States, local news, and a literary (feuilleton) section. By 1850, the Freiheits-Freund was a daily paper owned by cousins Louis Neeb and William Neeb, who had been employed by the paper since its early days. The Neebs brought increased attention to business and commercial news. Because of its strong opposition to slavery, the paper aligned itself with the Republican Party when that party first organized.

Volksblatt
Carl Friedrich Bauer, a Forty-Eighter who fled the German states after the failed revolutions of 1848, founded the Pittsburger Volksblatt ("People's Paper") in 1859 after leaving the editorial office of the Freiheits-Freund. Bauer remained owner of the Volksblatt until 1885, when he left to join the Milwaukee Herold. Some time later, the Volksblatt was acquired by the brothers Isaac E. and Louis Hirsch, under whose leadership the paper gained an increasing share of the market formerly dominated by the Freiheits-Freund.

Merged publication
The Freiheits-Freund and Volksblatt served the German-speaking population of Pittsburgh until, in February 1901, the consolidation of the two papers and the founding of the Neeb-Hirsch Publishing Company took place. Thereafter, the papers were published as one under the title Volksblatt und Freiheits-Freund.

During World War I, the paper successfully withstood a swell of anti-German sentiment that caused many other German-American papers to succumb to circulation and advertising losses. Its survival has been credited to its pro-American reputation and major urban location.

Before the U.S. entered World War II, the paper took a denunciatory stance toward the German American Bund, a pro-Nazi organization in the United States. By this time, the paper was facing a scarcity of local German speakers, and in 1942, amid another unfavorable wartime cultural climate, the paper folded.

References

Publications established in 1901
Defunct newspapers published in Pittsburgh
German-American history
German-American culture in Pittsburgh
1901 establishments in Pennsylvania
German-language newspapers published in Pennsylvania